Type UC II minelaying submarines were used by the Imperial German Navy during World War I. They displaced 417 tons, carried guns, 7 torpedoes and up to 18 mines. The ships were double-hulled with improved range and seakeeping compared to the UC I type.

If judged only by the numbers of enemy vessels destroyed, the UC II is the most successful submarine design in history: According to modern estimates, they sank more than 1800 enemy vessels.

List of Type UC II submarines 
There were 64 Type UC II submarines commissioned into the Imperial German Navy.

See also

References

Citations

Bibliography

 Conway's All the World's Fighting Ships 1906–1921

Submarine classes
German Type UC II submarines
World War I submarines of Germany
World War I minelayers of Germany